Bouchercon is an annual convention of creators and devotees of mystery and detective fiction. It is named in honour of writer, reviewer, and editor Anthony Boucher; also the inspiration for the Anthony Awards, which have been issued at the convention since 1986. This page details Bouchercon XXXVI and the 20th Anthony Awards ceremony.

Bouchercon
The convention was held in Chicago, Illinois on September 1, 2005; running until the 4th. The event was chaired by "mystery fans extraordinaire" Sonya Rice, and founder of the Society Hill playhouse, Deen Kogan.

Special Guests
Lifetime Achievement awards — Bill Pronzini & Marcia Muller
International Guest of Honor — Jonathan Gash
American Guest of Honor — Dennis Lehane
Fan Guest of Honor — Beth Fedyn
Toastmaster — Harlan Coben

Anthony Awards
The following list details the awards distributed at the twentieth annual Anthony Awards ceremony.

Novel award
Winner:
William Kent Krueger, Blood Hollow

Shortlist:
Ken Bruen, The Killing of the Tinkers
John Katzenbach, The Madman's Tale
Laura Lippman, By a Spider's Thread
T. Jefferson Parker, California Girl
Julia Spencer-Fleming, Out of the Deep I Cry

First novel award
Winner:
Harley Jane Kozak, Dating Dead Men

Shortlist:
Sandra Balzo, Uncommon Grounds
Judy Clemens, Until the Cows Come Home
Jilliane Hoffman, Retribution
J. A. Konrath, Whiskey Sour

Paperback original award
Winner:
Jason Starr, Twisted City

Shortlist:
Robin Burcell, Cold Case
Roberta Isleib, Putt to Death
Susan McBride, Blue Blood
M. J. Rose, The Halo Effect

Short story award
Winner:
Elaine Viets, "Wedding Knife", from Chesapeake Crimes

Shortlist:
Rhys Bowen, "Voodoo", from Alfred Hitchcock's Mystery Magazine November 2004
Terence Faherty, "The Widow of Slane", from Ellery Queen's Mystery Magazine March / April 2004
Ted Hertel Jr., "It's Crackers to Slip a Rozzer the Dropsy in Snide", from Small Crimes
Arthur Nersesian, "Hunter/Trapper", from Brooklyn Noir

Critical / Non-fiction award
Winner:
Max Allan Collins, Men's Adventure Magazines

Shortlist:
Frankie Bailey & Steven Chermak, Famous American Crimes & Trials
Edward Conlon, Blue Blood
Leslie S. Klinger, The New Annotated Sherlock Holmes
Julian Rubinstein, The Ballad of the Whiskey Robber

Cover art award
Winner:
Sohrab Habibion; for Tim McLoughlin, Brooklyn Noir

Shortlist:
Gregory Manchess; for Max Phillips, Fade to Blonde
Sal Barracca; for J. A. Konrath, Whiskey Sour
Robert Santora; for Ruth Francisco, Good Morning, Darkness
Michael Kellner; for Gary Phillips, Monkology

References

Anthony Awards
36
2005 in Illinois